George MacDonald Sacko (19 May 1936 – 17 September 2011)  was a Liberian footballer striker.

References

1936 births
2011 deaths
Association football forwards
Liberian footballers
Liberian expatriate footballers
Liberia international footballers